Luciano Fabbroni (13 December 1911 – 24 August 2000) was an Italian boxer. He competed in the men's welterweight event at the 1932 Summer Olympics.

References

External links
 

1911 births
2000 deaths
Italian male boxers
Olympic boxers of Italy
Boxers at the 1932 Summer Olympics
People from Grosseto
Welterweight boxers
Sportspeople from the Province of Grosseto
20th-century Italian people